In philosophy, the Weyl's tile argument, introduced by Hermann Weyl in 1949, is an argument against the notion that physical space is "discrete", as if composed of a number of finite sized units or tiles. The argument purports to show a distance function approximating Pythagoras' theorem on a discrete space cannot be defined and, since the Pythagorean theorem has been confirmed to be approximately true in nature, physical space is not discrete. Academic debate on the topic continues, with counterarguments proposed in the literature.

A demonstration of Weyl's argument proceeds by constructing a square tiling of the plane representing a discrete space. A discretized triangle,  units tall and  units long, can be constructed on the tiling. The hypotenuse of the resulting triangle will be  tiles long. However, by the Pythagorean theorem, a corresponding triangle in a continuous space—a triangle whose height and length are —will have a hypotenuse measuring  units long. The argument can be constructed for more general triangles, but, in each case, the result is the same. Thus, a discrete space does not even approximate the Pythagorean theorem.

In response, Kris McDaniel has argued the Weyl tile argument depends on accepting a "size thesis" which posits that the distance between two points is given by the number of tiles between the two points. However, as McDaniel points out, the size thesis is not accepted for continuous spaces. Thus, we might have reason not to accept the size thesis for discrete spaces.

See also
 Digital physics
 Discrete calculus
 Taxicab metric
 Causal sets
 Poisson point process

References

Philosophy of physics
Philosophy of mathematics
Discrete geometry
Spacetime